Darogas (also spelled darogha or daroghah) were police officials in the Mughal Empire and the British Raj. In the Mughal Empire, a daroga was superintendent of the "slaves" of a Mughal monarch.

Duties performed by daroga
The darogas served in the armies of Kachhwahas and Mughals; and in accordance with the duties performed by them, the darogas were given various titles like daroga-i-sutarkhana, daroga-i-topkhana, and daroga-i-baroodkhana.

Daroghas answered to district magistrates who were in charge of areas at least ; because the magistrates were responsible for such a large area, the daroghas were normally the most powerful local authorities. In some cases, they were in charge of factories. The darogas also had command over the police in rural areas.

Female daroga
The women assigned to the administration of the imperial harem were also given the title of darogha. The position was appointed by the emperor himself, and marked a great honor for the woman and her family. Consequently, the women given these posts were chosen because they were well brought up, educated and from respectable families. Asmat Banu Begam, the mother of Empress Nur Jahan, had at one time acted in this role. Female daroghas were tasked with maintaining court etiquette and keeping the peace within the harem.

Daroga by birth
Ramya Sreenivasan stated that the male children born from "the illegitimate union of Rajputs and their inferiors" were referred to as daroga and gola, while the female children born from such union were referred to as darogi and goli.

Ravana Rajputs

Lindsey Harlan identified the darogas with the Ravana Rajputs.

References

Gubernatorial titles
Law enforcement titles
Government of the Mughal Empire
Positions of subnational authority
Historical law enforcement occupations
Mughal Harem